Harold Parkinson Dukes (31 March 1912 – 13 August 1988) was an English professional football goalkeeper who made over 115 appearances in the Football League for Norwich City.

Career statistics

References

English footballers
Footballers from Portsmouth
Ipswich Town F.C. players
English Football League players
Association football goalkeepers
1912 births
1988 deaths
Norwich City F.C. players
Norwich City F.C. wartime guest players
Brentford F.C. wartime guest players
Fulham F.C. wartime guest players
Queens Park Rangers F.C. wartime guest players
Bedford Town F.C. players
Guildford City F.C. players
Southern Football League players
Newmarket Town F.C. players